The 2016–17 season of the Belgian First Division B began in August 2016 and ended on 28 April 2017. It was the inaugural season of the First Division B following a change in league format from the old Belgian Second Division. The fixtures were announced on 23 June 2016.

Although scoring most points overall, Lierse missed out on promotion as they came second in both the opening and closing tournament, leaving K.S.V. Roeselare and Antwerp to battle it out for promotion.  Following thirteen years at the second level of Belgian football, Antwerp secured promotion on 11 March 2017. At the bottom end of the table, Lommel United suffered relegation as they could not overcome their deficit from the regular season during the relegation playoff.

Structural changes
This season is the first under the name First Division B as a result of reforms in the Belgian football league system. The format of the league has been completely overhauled, with the season now consisting of two separate tournaments. The first tournament will be held from August to December, the second from January until April. The two tournament winners will play a two legged playoff to determine who is promoted to the 2017–18 Belgian First Division A. If a team wins both tournaments, it automatically clinches promotion. The top three teams in the aggregate table besides the promoted team will take part in the Europa League playoffs together with the teams in the 2016–17 Belgian First Division A finishing in positions 7 through 15. The remaining four teams will play a relegation playoff to determine the one team that will drop into the 2017–18 Belgian First Amateur Division.

Team changes
Due to the reformation, only 7 teams of the previous season remained in the league, with 1 other being replaced. As a result, the league moved from 17 to 8 teams.

Out
 Due to the fact that 2015–16 Belgian Second Division champions WS Brussels were refused a Belgian professional football license, Eupen was promoted as runner-up instead, while WS Brussels was relegated to the 2016–17 Belgian First Amateur Division.
 All teams finishing below 9th place were also relegated into the 2016–17 Belgian First Amateur Division, which (starting from 10th place) included Dessel Sport, Seraing United, Virton, ASV Geel, Deinze, Patro Eisden Maasmechelen, Heist and Coxyde.

In
 OH Leuven were relegated from the Belgian Pro League after finishing in last place.

Team information

Stadiums and locations

Personnel and kits

Managerial changes

League table

Opening tournament

Closing tournament

Aggregate table

Promotion play-offs
The winners of the opening tournament and the closing tournament meet in a two-legged match to determine the division champion, who will promote to the 2017–18 Belgian First Division A. The team finishing highest in the aggregate table will play the second leg at home. In case one team wins both the opening and the closing tournament, these matches will not be played and the team is promoted automatically.

On 6 November 2016, Roeselare won the opening tournament and was therefore assured of playing at least the promotion play-offs. Following a loss against Antwerp on the penultimate day of the closing tournament, Roeselare could no longer win the closing tournament (and direct promotion) and as a result the promotion play-offs would be held. On the final day of the closing tournament, Roeselare then held Lierse to a draw, denying them the play-offs and setting Roeselare up with Antwerp to decide promotion. Antwerp twice beat Roeselare and thereby allowed the club to return to the highest level of professional football in Belgium following thirteen seasons at the second level. Initially, they did not receive a license to compete in professional football the following season, but the decision was overturned. Roeselare got to play the Europa League play-offs.

Antwerp won 5–2 on aggregate.

Relegation play-offs
The four bottom teams in the aggregate table will take part in the relegation play-offs in which they keep half of the points they collected during the overall regular season (rounded up). As a result, the teams started with the following points before the playoff: Tubize 17 points, Cercle Brugge 17, OH Leuven 15 and Lommel United 9. The points of Cercle Brugge were rounded up, therefore in case of any ties on points at the end of the playoffs, their half point would be deducted. The team finishing in last position relegated to the 2017–18 Belgian First Amateur Division.

Despite starting with a huge deficit, Lommel United managed to close the gap between them and the other teams by obtaining 10 points out of their first four matches, overtaking Cercle Brugge and virtually being saved from relegation. At that point, neither team was saved as OH Leuven and Tubize had 20 points and Cercle Brugge and Lommel United were only one point behind. On matchday five, Lommel United first lost against Cercle Brugge and one day later on 22 April 2017, Tubize beat OH Leuven resulting in both Tubize and Cercle Brugge to be saved. On 28 April 2017, the final match, OH Leuven and Lommel United played each other in a direct confrontation to avoid relegation, with OH Leuven needing only a draw. The match ended 1–0 resulting in the relegation of Lommel United.

Season statistics

Top scorers

Top assists

Number of teams by provinces

Notes

References

Belgian First Division B seasons
Bel
2